Yuezhou or Yue Prefecture was a zhou (prefecture) in imperial China in modern Hunan, China, centering on modern Yueyang.

Counties
Yue Prefecture administered the following counties through history:

References

 
 
 

Prefectures of the Sui dynasty
Prefectures of the Tang dynasty
Prefectures of Ma Chu
Jinghu North Circuit
Former prefectures in Hunan